The 2007 Tour of the Basque Country was the 47th edition of the Tour of the Basque Country road cycling stage race, taking place from 9 April to 14 April 2007. The race was won by Juan José Cobo of the Saunier Duval–Prodir cycling team.

Stages

Stage 1
9 April 2007 – Urretxu to Urretxu, 

{|
|Stage 1 result
{| class="wikitable"
|-
!
!Cyclist
!Team
!Time
!UCI ProTourPoints
|- style="background:lightblue"
|1
| Juan José Cobo
|SDV
|align=right| 3h 43' 05"
|align=right| 3 pts
|-
|2| Constantino Zaballa
|CEI
|align=right| + 10"
|align=right| 2 pts
|-
|3| Óscar Sevilla
|REG
|align=right| + 11"
|align=right| N/A
|}
||
|General Classification after Stage 1|}

Stage 210 April 2007 – Urretxu to Karrantza, Stage 311 April 2007 – Karrantza to Vitoria-Gasteiz, Stage 412 April 2007 – Vitoria-Gasteiz to Lekunberri, Stage 513 April 2007 – Lekunberri to Oiartzun, Stage 614 April 2007 – Oiartzun to Oiartzun (ITT), '''

Final standing

General classification

Mountains classification

Points classification

Regularidad classification

Team classification

Jersey progress

References

External links
2007 Tour of the Basque Country on cyclingnews.com

2007
2007 UCI ProTour
Bas